Maikel Benner (born 24 March 1980 in Schiedam) is a Dutch baseball player.

Benner represented the Netherlands at the 2004 Summer Olympics in Athens where he and his team became sixth.

External links
Benner at the Dutch Olympic Archive

1980 births
Living people
Baseball players at the 2004 Summer Olympics
Olympic baseball players of the Netherlands
Dutch baseball players
Sportspeople from Schiedam
DOOR Neptunus players
ADO players
L&D Amsterdam Pirates players
2006 World Baseball Classic players